Chief of Air Force (CAF) is the most senior appointment in the Royal New Zealand Air Force, responsible to the Chief of Defence Force.  The post was originally known as the Chief of the Air Staff.

Appointees

The following list chronologically records those who have held the post of Chief of Air Force or its preceding positions, with rank and honours as at the completion of the individual's term.

References

Royal New Zealand Air Force
New Zealand